"Cherry Red" is a song by the Bee Gees, written by Barry Gibb, released as the B-side of "I Want Home" in March 1966, and has become one of the famous Bee Gees songs in the Philippines and Brazil. The song's opening chord was E followed by Barry singing Where are you?.

"Cherry Red" is a ballad featuring a harmony by Barry and Robin. It was recorded around February 1966 in Festival Studios, Sydney, during the same time as "I Want Home". Colin Petersen thinks he played drums on the two tracks.

Release
Unlike many of the Bee Gees' Australian tracks, this single reached charts outside of Australia, in the Philippines, Brazil and São Paulo, all of which it reached top ten in.

Personnel
 Barry Gibb — lead and harmony vocal, guitar
 Robin Gibb — lead and harmony vocal
 Maurice Gibb  — guitar, organ
 Colin Petersen  — drums

Chart performance

References

Bee Gees songs
1966 songs
1966 singles
Songs written by Barry Gibb
Leedon Records singles
Festival Records singles